Institute of Contemporary History may refer to:

 The Wiener Library and Institute of Contemporary History, London, England
 Institut für Zeitgeschichte, Munich, Germany
 Inštitut za novejšo zgodovino, Ljubljana, Slovenia
 Samtidshistoriska institutet, Södertörn University College, Stockholm, Sweden
 Institute of Contemporary History, University of Vienna
 Institute of Contemporary History, Czech Academy of Sciences

See also
 Contemporary History Institute, Athens, Ohio, United States
 Centre for Contemporary History, Potsdam, Germany